Amorbia exustana is a species of moth of the family Tortricidae. It is found in Colombia and Costa Rica, where it is found at altitudes between 800 and 2,000 meters.

The length of the forewings is 10.5–11.5 mm for males and 12–13 mm for females. The ground colour of the forewings is reddish brown. They are variable in intensity of colour and shape of the fasciae. The hindwings are white with grey mottling toward the apex. Adults are on wing in both the dry and the rainy seasons.

References

Moths described in 1866
Sparganothini
Moths of Central America
Moths of South America